Summer Color My Girl (Japanese: 夏色 MY GIRL; Natsuiro My Girl) is the third Japanese single of the South Korean boy group, BTOB. It is the second original Japanese single of the group, and was released on August 19, 2016.

The single is available physically with 3 Regular Edition type, and 1 Limited Edition type. Each regular edition CDs, contains the lead single and different b-sides while the limited CD+DVD edition contains a photo booklet and the making DVD.

Track list

Chart performance

References

2015 singles
Japanese-language songs
2015 songs
BtoB songs